"It's Been So Long, Darling" is a 1945 song by Ernest Tubb.  "It's Been So Long, Darling" was Ernest Tubb's seventh chart entry on the country charts and his second to make it to number one, where it stayed for four weeks and a total of thirteen weeks on the chart.

Covers
1952 – Don Cherry, single
1957 – Hank Snow on the album Country and Western Jamboree
1961 – Eddy Arnold on the album Let's Make Memories Tonight 
1961 – George Jones on Sings Country and Western Hits
1963 – Bill Anderson on the album Still
1963 – Glen Campbell on Too Late to Worry – Too Blue to Cry
1965 – George Hamilton IV on Mister Sincerity... A Tribute to Ernest Tubb
1966 – Loretta Lynn on I Like 'Em Country, which charted at #2 on the country charts
1969 – Carl Smith on Faded Love and Winter Roses
1980 – Merle Haggard on The Way I Am

References

1945 songs
Ernest Tubb songs
Glen Campbell songs